Jake Perry may refer to:

Jake Perry in Creme Puff (cat)
Jake Perry, fictional character in Sweet Home Alabama (film)